Old Taylor Bourbon is a brand of straight bourbon whiskey produced at Buffalo Trace Distillery in Franklin County, Kentucky by the Sazerac Company. It was named in honor of the historic distiller Col. Edmund Haynes Taylor, Jr.

Col. E. H. Taylor is a premium version available in small batch, single barrel, and barrel proof versions, and as a rye whiskey. Some expressions of the bourbon and rye are bottled in bond.

History 

Old Taylor Bourbon was named in honor of Edmund Haynes Taylor, Jr., who was born in Columbus, Kentucky, in 1832. 
Taylor was a grand nephew of U.S. President Zachary Taylor. Like various other figures in the Kentucky whiskey industry, Taylor is often referred to in public relations materials as a "Colonel", since he held the honorary title of Kentucky Colonel. The honorary title resembles that of the military rank but is not actually associated with military service and has primarily been used for public relations purposes (e.g., by "Colonel" Harland Sanders, the founder of Kentucky Fried Chicken). Taylor started and owned seven different distilleries throughout his career, the most successful being the O.F.C. and Carlisle distilleries, the forerunners of today's Buffalo Trace Distillery.

E. H. Taylor is said to have lobbied in favor of the Bottled-in-Bond Act, a law that gave participating whiskey producers a tax break and a government certification of product quality. He was a contemporary of and acquaintance with various other notable whiskey business figures as Dr. James C. Crow, Oscar Pepper, Judge William B. McBrayer, John H. McBrayer and W. F. Bond, and was an adept businessman and public relations professional when it came to packaging and promoting his bourbon. Some expressions of the current brand continue to be offered as bottled-in-bond versions.

Unlike most distilleries of the time that looked like little more than a sawmill sitting in a thicket, Taylor's distillery on Glenn's Creek, near Frankfort, was designed to resemble a medieval castle with the landscaped grounds of an estate. The distillery attracted tourists and picnickers who were given complimentary "tenth pint" bottles of Old Taylor.

In the late 1940s, Old Taylor bourbon was promoted with the slogan, "Sign of a good host".

By 1972, the historic "castle" distillery structure had been abandoned, and it remained abandoned but still standing in deteriorating condition for more than 40 years. Some of the material from the barrel houses was reclaimed for construction. The facility was refurbished starting in 2015, and began operating as a distillery again in 2016. The new distillery operation is not affiliated with the current owners of the Old Taylor brand.

On June 24, 2009, Buffalo Trace Distillery (part of the Sazerac Company) purchased the Old Taylor Bourbon label and barrel inventory from Beam Global Spirits & Wine (now Beam Suntory), the maker of Jim Beam Bourbon and subsidiary of the Fortune Brands holding company. The brand was purchased in an agreement where Beam bought the Effen Vodka brand from Sazerac.

References

External links 
 The Sazerac Company official web site

Bourbon whiskey
Sazerac Company brands